Haimbachia squamulella is a moth in the family Crambidae. It was described by Zeller in 1881. It is found in North America, where it has been recorded from Maryland to Florida and Texas, west to Illinois.

The wingspan is about 16 mm. Adults are on wing from June to July.

References

Haimbachiini
Moths described in 1881